Indocypha is a genus of jewel damselfly in the family Chlorocyphidae. There are about eight described species in Indocypha. The species was first spotted in Thailand.

Species
These eight species belong to the genus Indocypha:
 Indocypha catopta Zhang, Hämäläinen & Tong, 2010
 Indocypha chishuiensis Zhou & Zhou, 2006
 Indocypha cyanicauda Zhang & Hämäläinen, 2018
 Indocypha katharina (Needham, 1930)
 Indocypha neglecta Hämäläinen, 2014
 Indocypha silbergliedi Asahina, 1988
 Indocypha svenhedini (Sjöstedt, 1933)
 Indocypha vittata (Selys, 1891)

References

Further reading

 
 
 

Chlorocyphidae
Articles created by Qbugbot